"Man I Used to Be" is a song by Canadian alternative rapper k-os. It was released in January 2005 as the third single from his 2004 album Joyful Rebellion.

Content
The song tells the story of a man who has gone through rough times and wishes to be back the way he was originally. According to the Joyful Rebellion liner notes, the song is indeed about Michael Jackson in particular, as well as k-os himself (and people in general).

Music video
The video, directed by Micah Meisner, begins with breakdancers in the hallway of an apartment building and k-os is in his room packing to leave, taking a box of seemingly great importance. k-os hails a taxi outside of the Hotel Waverly and two men fight a duel by dancing on the sidewalk. A bag man, pushing a cart with a neon light, sings the lyrics and k-os riding in the taxi, disappears by opening his box, which teleports him to the cockpit of a spacecraft in space. Footage of Maasai are seen on k-os's screen and the spacecraft enters warp drive.

Charts

References

2004 songs
2005 singles
EMI Records singles
K-os songs